Athara Hazari , is an administrative sub-division (Tehsil) of the Jhang District, Punjab, Pakistan.  There is a holy shrine of Pir Taj Din. Pir Tajuddin came from Kot Crore to Mouza Maghiana (Jhang) for sightseeing and recreation. When he came to the river Jhelum, he saw the unconsciousness of Islam in the people. He took up residence here and popularized the religion of Islam.

References

Jhang District
Tehsils of Punjab, Pakistan